Oonah Fay Shannahan ( Murray; 3 September 1921 – 28 September 2022) was a New Zealand netball player. She captained the New Zealand team in their second Test match, in 1948 against Australia.

Early life
Shannahan was born Oonah Fay Murray in Dunedin on 3 September 1921, one of five children of Frederick Joseph Murray and Margaret Murray. Her father worked on the railways, and the family moved to Taihape for five years before settling in Christchurch. She was educated at Sacred Heart Girls' College in Christchurch, where she excelled at sports, winning the senior athletics championship in 1937 and 1938.

Netball career
Murray was captain of the Canterbury provincial netball team, and in 1948 she was selected as captain of the New Zealand national team for the first Test against the touring Australian team at Forbury Park in Dunedin. The match was played under international rules, with seven players per side, which were unfamiliar to the New Zealanders who were used to playing nine-a-side. The Australian team was victorious, winning 27–16. The match was the only occasion on which Murray represented New Zealand, because the New Zealand side for the three-Test series was selected on a regional basis, and she was unavailable for the final game as it conflicted with the wedding of Murray's sister.

Later life and death
Oonah Murray married Francis John Shannahan, a New Zealand secondary schools association football representative that toured Australia in 1938. The couple had two children, and he died in 2009.

After her playing career, Shannahan continued her involvement in netball as an administrator, and she received a Netball New Zealand service award. She lived with her daughter at McCormacks Bay, and celebrated her 100th birthday on 3 September 2021. She died in Christchurch on 28 September 2022, at the age of 101. At the time of her death, she was the oldest living New Zealand netball international.

References

1921 births
2022 deaths
Sportspeople from Dunedin
New Zealand international netball players
People educated at Catholic Cathedral College
Netball players from Christchurch
New Zealand centenarians
Women centenarians